The 10th Oceania Swimming Championships were held 20–23 May 2014, at the Westwave Aquatic Centre in Auckland, New Zealand. It was the tenth edition of the biennial championships, and featured competition in swimming, open water swimming and synchronized swimming. The open water events were held 11–12 January 2014, in Lake Taupo.

Participating countries
Countries with confirmed teams for the 2014 Oceania Swimming Championships were:

Event Schedule

Results

Swimming

Men

Women

Mixed events

Overall medal table

External links
Event site
Results

References

Oceania Swimming Championships, 2014
2014 in New Zealand sport
Oceania Swimming Championships, 2014
Oceania Swimming Championships
Swimming competitions in New Zealand
International aquatics competitions hosted by New Zealand
May 2014 sports events in New Zealand